The Bloukrans Pass of the Onder-Bokkeveld region, is located on the R355 road between Ceres and Calvinia, in the Northern Cape province of South Africa. It navigates the lower slopes of the Bloukrans Mountain on its eastern shoulder, and has the Nuwewater se berg on its western side. The Bloukrans Mountain is the northern promontory of the Roggeveld Mountains.

External links 
 Passes Index at Wild Dog Adventure Riding website

Mountain passes of the Western Cape
Mountain passes of the Northern Cape